Kovelamudi Bapayya is an Indian film director. He has directed about 80 films in Telugu and Hindi languages. He is the cousin of noted director K. Raghavendra Rao and nephew of director and producer K. S. Prakash Rao.

Early life 
Kovelamudi Bapayya was born in Hyderabad. He is also known as K. Bapayya. Bapayya lost both his parents at a very young age. He was raised by his paternal uncle K. S. Prakash Rao, who was a popular filmmaker. He is a first cousin of K. Raghavendra Rao, also a filmmaker. He also has two daughters, Padma and Chamundeswari. Bapayya studied in Vijayawada and Chennai.

Career 
Bapayya began his film career by working under K. B. Tilak as an apprentice for the films Muddu Bidda (1956), M. L. A. (1957), and Attaa Okinti Kodale (1958). He then worked for Suresh Productions with Tapi Chanakya for the production's debut film Ramudu Bheemudu in 1964.

Bapayya made his directorial debut in the Tollywood film industry with the feature film Drohi in 1970. He was given the offer to direct the film by producer D. Rama Naidu. The film had Vanisri and Kongara Jaggaya playing the lead characters. The film that truly earned Bapayya name and fame in the Telugu film industry was the drama feature film Soggadu (1975). The Telugu film hit the silver screens on 19 December 1975 and was released again on 1 January 1976. It starred Sobhan Babu, Jayachitra and Jayasudha In the lead roles. The movie won two Filmfare awards. The drama film ran in 17 cinema halls in the then united Andhra Pradesh for one hundred days.

Bapayya made his directorial debut in the Bollywood film industry with the Hindi movie Dildaar (1977). Dildaar was a remake of Bapayya's Soggadu. The Bollywood film hit the big screens on 13 April 1977. It starred Jeetendra, Rekha and Nazneen in lead roles. Bapayya remained active in the film industry till the mid 1990s. Towards the end of his career, Bapayya started focusing on making Bollywood films. One of his blockbusters from the 1990s was Pyar Hua Chori Chori (1991). The romance film hit the theatre halls on 7 June 1991. The film starred Mithun Chakraborty, Gautami, Shikha Swaroop, Shafi Inamdaari, Shakti Kapoor and Anupam Kher. It was Gautami's Hindi debut and a remake of the Malayalam flick Chithram.

He also directed Parda Hai Parda (1992) which is remembered as Chunkey Pandey's solo hit and South Indian actress Meena's debut in the Bollywood film industry. The movie hit the screens on 10 July 1992. Bapayya was known to collaborate with Jeetendra and Mithun Chakraborty in the Bollywood industry.

Filmography

References

External links
 

Year of birth missing (living people)
Telugu film directors
Hindi-language film directors
Living people
Film directors from Andhra Pradesh
People from Krishna district
20th-century Indian film directors